Transpo may refer to:

Clarence-Rockland Transpo provides a public transportation service to residents of Clarence-Rockland, a city in eastern Ontario, Canada.
OC Transpo is the urban transit service of the City of Ottawa, Ontario, Canada.
South Bend Transpo is the public bus system of South Bend, Indiana, United States. Its legal name is South Bend Public Transportation Corporation.
Transpo 72 was a transportation exposition held at Dulles International Airport, Virginia in 1972
Transpo is a sequence of moves in the game of Chess